Carlo Pisacane, Duke of San Giovanni (22 August 1818 – 2 July 1857) was an Italian patriot and one of the first Italian socialist thinkers.   He argued that violence was necessary not only to draw attention to, or generate publicity for, a cause, but also to inform, educate, and ultimately rally the masses behind the revolution. These ideas are called propaganda of the deed and have exerted compelling influence on rebels and terrorists alike ever since.

Biography
Pisacane was born in Naples to an impoverished noble family, and entered the Neapolitan army in 1839; but having become imbued with Mazzinian ideas he emigrated in 1847, and after a short stay in England and France served in the French army in Algeria.

The revolution of 1848 recalled him to Italy; he played a part in the brief Roman Republic, and was an instrumental part of the war commission in the defence of the city. After its capture by the French, he again went into exile, first to London and then to Genoa, maintaining himself by teaching.

Pisacane regarded the rule of the House of Savoy as no better than that of Austria. When Mazzini, undeterred by the failure of the abortive Milan rising on 6 February 1853, determined to organize an expedition to provoke a rising in the Neapolitan kingdom, Pisacane offered himself for the task, and sailed from Genoa with a few followers (including Giovanni Nicotera) on board the steamer Cagliari on 25 June 1857.

They landed on the island of Ponza, where the guards were overpowered and some hundreds of prisoners liberated, and on 28 of the same month arrived at Sapri in Campania and attempted to reach the Cilento. But no assistance from the inhabitants was forthcoming: the Neapolitan authorities had spread the news that Pisacane and his followers were brigands who had come to steal and pillage, and the local peasants, instead of rising against the Bourbons, joined the Neapolitan troops in fighting the invaders. Half of Pisacane's men were massacred and the survivors were captured; several version exist about how Pisacane died. According to one, Pisacane was stabbed with a knife and then killed at Sanza by local inhabitants; according to another, he was killed by Bourbon soldiers; according to a third, he committed suicide after being gravely wounded.

A commemorative statue today exists in Sanza, where a commemoration of Pisacane's death is held every year.

Piscane's failed expedition anticipated the successful one carried out by Garibaldi several years later, and which fully achieved the  aim of overthrowing the Bourbon Monarchy.

Propaganda of the deed
Pisacane was a pioneering advocate of propaganda of the deed, arguing that "ideas result from deeds, not the latter from the former, and the people will not be free when they are educated, but educated when they are free."  He argued that violence was necessary not only to draw attention to, or generate publicity for, a cause, but also to inform, educate, and ultimately rally the masses behind the revolution. These ideas have exerted compelling influence on rebels and terrorist alike ever since.

During the historical period known as Risorgimento, Pisacane represented the extreme left, and as a follower of French philosopher Pierre-Joseph Proudhon introduced anarchism in Italy. His essays, titled "Saggi" and "Testamento Politico", were published posthumously in France.

He was an atheist.

Benito Mussolini was heavily influenced by Pisacane's  revolutionary ideas and ideals to achieve political goals.

Arts and culture
The landing is remembered in the poem  by Luigi Mercantini, composed in the same year. This poem in turn inspired the title of the 1952 film about the landing, Eran trecento. It was also translated into English by Henry W. Longfellow with the title The Gleaner of Sapri.

In August of every year Carlo Pisacane's landing is celebrated in a three-day festival in Sapri.

Pisacane's expedition is referenced in Umberto Eco's The Cemetery of Prague (Chapter 5).

References

Further reading
  Carlo Pisacane. La Rivoluzione. Revolution: An alternative answer to the Italian question translated and introduced by Richard Mann Roberts. (2011)

External links
 The Gleaner of Sapri

1818 births
1857 deaths
19th-century Neapolitan people
Italian republicans
Italian socialists
Italian soldiers
Italian people of the Italian unification
Italian atheists
Critics of the Catholic Church
1850s suicides
People convicted of adultery
Italian anarchists